1.1 may refer to:

 1.1.1.1, a Domain Name System service
 1.1-inch/75-caliber gun
 Falcon 9 v1.1 orbital launch vehicle
 Trabant 1.1, an automobile
 A one-day Category 1 race in the UCI race classifications system
 A software version number, including: 
 HTTP 1.1, a version of the Hypertext Transfer Protocol first published in 1997
 SAML 1.1, a version of Security Assertion Markup Language ratified in 2003

See also 
 11 (disambiguation)
 1:1 (disambiguation)
 1+1 (disambiguation)